A confidential secretary or  Mishu in Chinese politics is a personal secretary often trusted with secret, private information. Chinese Communist Party (CCP) leaders, as well as other political and military leaders are often assigned confidential secretaries, who are in charge of processing secret documents and telegrams, as well as translation and record-keeping.

Chinese political leaders often have multiple secretaries. For example, during the Republic of China era, leaders such as Sun Yat-sen and Chiang Kai-shek employed "confidential secretaries" and "attendant secretaries" in addition to the official secretarial staff attached to their office. When Mao Zedong ceased to hold a government post, he still retained various secretaries including a "confidential secretary" and a "personal secretary".

Jiyao mishu is sometimes shortened to "mishu", especially in Western works, but the latter term simply means "secretary" in Chinese and can mean any of a whole range of different positions from an administrative assistant in a small business to a policy advisor to the paramount leader (政治秘书, political secretary).

See also 

 Cadre system of the Chinese Communist Party

References 

Chinese Communist Party